The Journal of Thermal Spray Technology is a peer-reviewed scientific journal that is dedicated to thermal science and its application for the improvement of material properties and functionality of coatings. The journal regularly publishes review papers and special issues. it is published by Springer Science+Business Media on behalf of ASM International. The editor-in-chief is Armelle Vardelle (Université de Limoges).

Abstracting and indexing
The journal is abstracted and indexed in:

According to the Journal Citation Reports, the journal has a 2020 impact factor of 2.757.

References

External links

Engineering journals
Springer Science+Business Media academic journals
English-language journals
Publications established in 1992